"Just Another Woman in Love" is a song written by Wanda Mallette and Patti Ryan, and recorded by Canadian country music singer Anne Murray. It was released in the spring of 1984 as the third single from her Gold-certified album A Little Good News.

"Just Another Woman in Love" was Anne Murray's eighth #1 hit on Billboard'''s Country singles chart. It spent a total of 20 weeks on the US Country chart. "Just Another Woman in Love" also hit the Top 10 on the US Adult Contemporary chart.

Cover versions and parodies
In 2018, Filipino YouTuber Vic Desucatan uploaded a parody version of the song called "Manok na Pula"'' which become a viral hit in the Philippines in 2019.

Chart performance

Weekly charts

Year-end charts

References

External links
 

1984 singles
Anne Murray songs
Song recordings produced by Jim Ed Norman
Capitol Records singles
1983 songs